From These Wounds is the fourth studio album by the Norwegian doom metal band Funeral. The Norwegian digipak version is limited and comes with the bonus track "Breathing Through You", which is originally written by former member Thomas Angell and later modified by Ottersen and Forsmo. The American version also features that bonus track.
The cover artwork is designed by Kjetil Ottersen, credited under the alias SENSE:VERSUS.

Track listing
All music by Kjetil Ottersen and Funeral, except "Breathing Through You" written by Thomas Angell and Kjetil Ottersen. Choir sample on "This Barren Skin" is taken from "Lesson III for Maundy Thursday" composed by Orlande de Lassus and performed by the Oxford Camerata. Lyrics as noted.

 "This Barren Skin" - 8:10 (K. Ottersen)
 "From These Wounds" - 7:42 (F. Forsmo) 
 "The Architecture of Loss" - 9:02 (F. Forsmo)
 "Red Moon" - 8:32 (F. Forsmo)
 "Vagrant God" - 6:15 (K. Ottersen)
 "Pendulum" - 9:13 (F. Forsmo)
 "Saturn" - 8:24 (F. Forsmo)
 "Breathing Through You" - 7:23 (Bonus track) (F. Forsmo)

Band Line-up
Frode Forsmo - Vocals, Bass, Lyrics
Kjetil Ottersen - Guitars, Electronics, Lyrics
Christian Loos - Guitars
Anders Eek - Drums
Jon Borgerud - Live electronics (session member)

Release history

References

External links
From These Wounds review @ Heathen Harvest
From These Wounds review @ heavymetal.about.com
From These Wounds review @ heavymetal.no

2006 albums
Funeral (band) albums